Leuconotopicus is a genus of woodpeckers in the family Picidae native to North and South America.

Taxonomy
The genus was erected by the French ornithologist Alfred Malherbe in 1845 with Strickland's woodpecker (Leuconotopicus stricklandi) as the type species. The name Leuconotopicus combines the Ancient Greek leukos meaning "white", nōton meaning "back" and pikos meaning "woodpecker". The genus is sister to the genus Veniliornis and is one of eight genera placed in the tribe Melanerpini within the woodpecker subfamily Picinae.  The species now placed in this genus were previously assigned to Picoides.

The genus contains the following six species:

References

 
Bird genera
Taxa named by Alfred Malherbe